Angélica de la Peña Gómez (born 30 May 1954) is a Mexican politician affiliated with the PRD. She currently serves as Senator of the LXII Legislature of the Mexican Congress. She also served as Deputy of the Congress between 1997 and 2000 and from 2003 until 2006 always for plurinominal via.

References

1954 births
Living people
Politicians from Guadalajara, Jalisco
Members of the Senate of the Republic (Mexico)
Members of the Chamber of Deputies (Mexico)
Party of the Democratic Revolution politicians
21st-century Mexican politicians
21st-century Mexican women politicians
Women members of the Chamber of Deputies (Mexico)
Women members of the Senate of the Republic (Mexico)
University of Guadalajara alumni
20th-century Mexican politicians
20th-century Mexican women politicians